is a railway station in the town of Kawanishi, Yamagata, Japan, operated by the Yamagata Railway.

Lines
Nishi-Ōtsuka Station is a station on the Flower Nagai Line, and is located 10.3 rail kilometers from the terminus of the line at Akayu Station.

Station layout
The station has one side platform serving a single bi-directional track. The station is unattended.

Adjacent stations

History
Nishi-Ōtsuka Station opened on 15 November 1914. The station was absorbed into the JR East network upon the privatization of JNR on 1 April 1987, and became a station on the Yamagata Railway from 25 October 1988.

Surrounding area
 Mogami River 
 
 
 Okitama Public General Hospital

See also
List of railway stations in Japan

External links

  Flower Nagai Line 

Railway stations in Yamagata Prefecture
Yamagata Railway Flower Nagai Line
Railway stations in Japan opened in 1914
Kawanishi, Yamagata